The 1980 Prize of Moscow News was the 15th edition of an international figure skating competition organized in Moscow, Soviet Union. It was held December 10–14, 1980. Medals were awarded in the disciplines of men's singles, ladies' singles, pair skating and ice dancing.

Men

Ladies

Pairs

Ice dancing

References

1980 in figure skating
Prize of Moscow News